Ecem is a Turkish word meaning "my queen" and may refer to:

 Ecem Alıcı (born 1994), Turkish volleyball player
 Ecem Cumert (born 1998), Turkish-German footballer
 Ecem Güler (born 1992), Turkish basketball player
 Ecem Güzel (born 1995), Turkish sport sailor
 Ecem Taşın (born 1991), Turkish Paralympic judoka
 Emine Ecem Esen (born 1994), Turkish footballer

See also
 Ece

Turkish feminine given names